The Falconar AMF-14H Maranda is a Canadian amateur-built aircraft, designed and originally produced by Falconar Avia for the Canadian basic ultralight class and US light-sport aircraft category. The aircraft is supplied as a kit or as plans for amateur construction.

Since the winding up of business by Falconar Avia in 2019, the plans are now sold by Manna Aviation.

Design and development
The aircraft was developed from the heavier Falconar AMF-S14 Super Maranda.

The AMF-14H structure is made from wood, with its flying surfaces covered with doped aircraft fabric. Construction time from the supplied kit is 1100 hours.

Operational history
By December 2011 one example of this model had been completed.

Specifications (AMF-14H)

References

External links

Homebuilt aircraft
AMF-14H
Single-engined tractor aircraft
High-wing aircraft